Dimitra Kalentzou is a retired Greek professional basketball player. She played for Panathinaikos and Greece women's national basketball team. She has represented national team in several Eurobasket Women and in 2010 FIBA World Championship for Women.

References

External links 
 FIBA Europe profile

Living people
Greek women's basketball players
Basketball players from Athens
1978 births
Olympic basketball players of Greece
Basketball players at the 2004 Summer Olympics
Panathinaikos WBC players
Point guards